Uncomfortable Party (불편한 파티) is the sixth studio album by Korean Rock Band Crying Nut(Seoul Korea).  Music videos for Good Boy,  Uncomfortable Party, Dove, Ghost MIA were opened on YouTube. Crying Nut had their new album's Showcase at the Melon AX(Seoul Korea). The music video director Kim, Bo-Rahm later said, this was the funniest and happiest job he'd ever had. From this Album, Crying Nut possessed their own studio 'Tobada', so they would make their album independently. Thanks to this system, they could spend over 4 months to record Gold Rush which has a combination of art rock and metal rock. Dove was the biggest hit song for this album.
Only for CDs, there is a hidden video clip.

Track listing

Personnel 
 Park, Yoon-Sik  – vocal, guitar
 Lee, Sang-Myun  – guitar
 Han, kyung-Rok  – bass
 Lee, Sang-Hyuk  – drums
 Kim, In-Soo  – accordion, organ

Additional personnel
 Choi, Chul-wook - trombone (Leave, Coffee Story)
 Oh, Jung-Seok - trumpet (Leave, Coffee Story)
 Jung, Jae-Hyun - saxophone (Leave, Coffee Story)
 Yi, Jah-Rahm - featuring (Leave)
 Hong, Cho-Yeon - narration (Coffee Story)
 Go, Ah-Sung - 'Attention, Bow' (Good Boy)

References

External links

2006 albums
Korean-language albums